This page records the details of the Japan national football team in 2007.

General

 The Japan national football team competed in the 2007 AFC Asian Cup and won the 2007 Kirin Cup in amongst other friendly matches played.

Schedule

Key
 H = Home match
 A = Away match
 N = Neutral venue

Players statistics

Top goal scorers for 2007

Kits

References

External links
Japan Football Association

Japan national football team results
2007 in Japanese football
Japan